The National Liberation Front of Corsica ( or ; , abbreviated FLNC) is a militant group that advocates an independent state on the island of Corsica, separate from France. The organisation was primarily present in Corsica and less so on the French mainland. A Conculta Naziunalista was often considered to be the political wing of the organisation.

Typical militant acts by the FLNC were bombings aimed at public buildings, banks, tourist infrastructures, military buildings and other perceived French symbols, in addition to aggravated assault against civilians, armed bank robbery, and extortion against private enterprises through so-called "revolutionary taxes". The attacks were usually performed against buildings and the island's infrastructures, but it was also not uncommon for the FLNC to have individual people as targets, such as Claude Érignac who was killed in 1998.

History

Foundation and objectives 
The FLNC was created from a merger of Ghjustizia Paolina and the Fronte Paesanu Corsu di Liberazione, the two largest Corsican armed organizations. It was an offshoot of the political party A Cuncolta Independentista which had members in the Corsican Assembly and some support among the locals.

The FLNC carried out its first attacks on the night of 4 May 1976 with 21 bombs exploding in Ajaccio, Bastia, Sartène, Porto-Vecchio and other Corsican towns. The majority of the targets were public buildings and offices of estate agents. On 5 May the FLNC formally announced its existence when it issued a bilingual manifesto which also claimed responsibility for the previous night's attacks.

The manifesto contained six demands:

 The recognition of the National Right of the Corsican people.
 The removal of all instruments of French colonialism – including the French Army and colonists.
 The setting up of a popular democratic government which would express the will and the needs of the Corsican people.
 The confiscation of "colonial" estates.
 Agrarian reform to fulfill the aspirations of farmers, workers and intellectuals and rid the country of all forms of exploitation.
 The right to self-determination of the Corsican people.

2014 to present 
In 2014, the  organisation announced the cessation of its armed struggle, which they confirmed again in 2016. Nevertheless, a number of minor splinter groups have so far emerged and are still active. The FLNC warned in 2016 that any attacks on Corsica by ISIL will be met with swift retaliation.

Armed campaign

Notes

References

External links 

 Corsican nationalist website, mostly in French, with a lot of information about the FLNC

Corsican nationalism
Paramilitary organizations based in France
Separatism in France
Secessionist organizations in Europe
National liberation movements
Terrorism in France
Banned secessionist parties